The 1936–37 New York Americans season was the Americans' 12th season of play. After qualifying for the playoffs in 1936, the Americans again placed last in the Canadian Division to miss qualifying for the playoffs. The Americans had now failed to qualify in ten of the franchise's twelve seasons in New York.

Offseason

Regular season

Final standings

Record vs. opponents

Game log

Playoffs
The Americans didn't qualify for the playoffs

Player stats

Regular season
Scoring

Goaltending

Awards and records

Transactions

See also
1936–37 NHL season

References

External links
 

New York Americans seasons
New York Americans
New York Americans
New York Amer
New York Amer
1930s in Manhattan
Madison Square Garden